Shorea curtisii (also called Seraya, and along with some other species in the genus Shorea, dark red meranti) is a species of tree in the family Dipterocarpaceae. It is native to Borneo, Peninsular Malaysia, Singapore and Thailand.
It grows as a large tree with a grey or reddish-brown and coarsely fissured trunk; and a greyish-blue crown. It fruits every 5–10 years, after prolonged periods of drought.

References

curtisii
Trees of Borneo
Trees of Malaya
Trees of Thailand
Taxonomy articles created by Polbot